John McGowan may refer to:

John McGowan (Medal of Honor) (1831–?), American Civil War sailor and Medal of Honor recipient
John McGowan (naval officer) (1843–1915), American Civil War veteran and US Navy rear admiral 
John McGowan (politician) (1845–1922), Ontario MPP and member of the Canadian House of Commons
John Reid McGowan (1872–1912), Australian boxing champion
J. P. McGowan (1880–1952), American Hollywood actor and director
Jack McGowan (1894–1977), American Broadway writer, performer and producer
Jack McGowan (golfer) (1930–2001), American professional golfer
John McGowan (footballer) (born 1952), Scottish footballer
John McGowan (professor) (born 1953), American academic, Distinguished Professor of the Humanities at the University of North Carolina
John W. McGowan, member of the New York State Assembly